The 2019 FIBA U16 Women's European Championship Division C was the 15th edition of the Division C of the FIBA U16 Women's European Championship, the third tier of the European women's under-16 basketball championship. It was played in Chișinău, Moldova, from 16 to 21 July 2019. Cyprus women's national under-16 basketball team won the tournament.

Participating teams

First round

Group A

Group B

5th–7th place classification

Group C

Championship playoffs

Final standings

References

External links
FIBA official website

2019
2019–20 in European women's basketball
FIBA U16
FIBA
Sport in Chișinău